Alicyclobacillus sendaiensis is a species of Gram positive, strictly aerobic, bacterium. The bacteria are acidophilic and produced endospores. It was first isolated from soil in Aoba-yama Park,
Sendai, Japan. The species was first described in 2003, and the name refers to the city from which it was first isolated. It was found during a survey in search of bacteria that produce thermostable collagenase.

The optimum growth temperature for A. sendaiensis is 55 °C, and can grow in the 40-65 °C range. The optimum pH is 5.5, and can grow in pH 2.5-6.5.

References

Gram-positive bacteria
Bacteria described in 2003
Bacillales